Chu Chua Cottonwood Provincial Park is a provincial park in British Columbia, Canada, located 80km north of Kamloops and incorporating a group of forested islands in the floodplain of the North Thompson River.

References
BC Parks webpage
BC Geographical Names entry "Chu Chua Cottonwood Park"
BC Geographical Names entry "Chu Chua (locality)"

Provincial parks of British Columbia
Thompson Country
Year of establishment missing
1996 establishments in British Columbia
Protected areas established in 1996